Patrick Mignola (born 8 August 1971) is a French politician who presided over the Democratic Movement and affiliated democrats group in the National Assembly from 2018 to 2022. He represented the 4th constituency of the Savoie department in the National Assembly from 2017 until 2022.

Political career
Prior to his election to the National Assembly in 2017, Mignola served as Deputy Mayor of La Ravoire from 1995 and then won the mayorship in 2001. From 1998 to 2010, he was elected to the General Council of Savoie for the canton of La Ravoire. From 2016 to 2017, he also held one of the vice presidencies of the Regional Council of Auvergne-Rhône-Alpes under the presidency of Laurent Wauquiez.

In Parliament, Mignola serves on the Committee on Sustainable Development and Spatial Planning. He also served as a member of the Committee on Finance (2017–2018), the Committee on Social Affairs (2017–2020) and the Committee on Cultural Affairs and Education (2018–2019). In addition to his committee assignments, he is a member of the French-Italian Parliamentary Friendship Group.

When Marc Fesneau joined the government in October 2018, Mignola was elected to the presidency of the Democratic Movement and affiliated group. Under his leadership, the group grew in size as members of other groups joined the MoDem group.

In the 2022 legislative election, Mignola ran for reelection but lost his seat against Jean-François Coulomme of La France Insoumise.

Political positions
Together with Jean-Noël Barrot, Mignola proposed a law to introduce mail-in voting to facilitate voting during the public health crisis caused by the COVID-19 pandemic in France.

In early 2021, Mignola proposed the introduction of proportional representation for France's nine most populated departments in the country's electoral law ahead of the 2022 legislative election.

References

1971 births
Living people
Deputies of the 15th National Assembly of the French Fifth Republic
Union for French Democracy politicians
Democratic Movement (France) politicians
Departmental councillors (France)
Regional councillors of Auvergne-Rhône-Alpes
Mayors of places in Auvergne-Rhône-Alpes
Sciences Po alumni
Politicians from Chambéry
French people of Italian descent
Members of Parliament for Savoie